Sukhvor-e Ali Mohammad-e Gol Mohammadi (also Romanized as Sūkhvor-e ‘Alī Moḩammad-e Gol Moḩammadī and Sūkhūr-e ‘Alī Moḩammad-e Gol Moḩammadī; also known as Sūkhar-e Moḩammadī and Sūkhvor Gol Moḩammadī) is a village in Heydariyeh Rural District, Govar District, Gilan-e Gharb County, Kermanshah Province, Iran. During the 2006 census, its population was 229, in 48 families.

References 

Populated places in Gilan-e Gharb County